The Seattle 500 Study is a University of Washington study that tracks individuals from birth.  It is a longitudinal prospective study of the effects of prenatal health habits on human development.  Beginning in 1974, this study has continuously followed a birth cohort of approximately 500 offspring. Current data collection is aimed at studying the development of mental health problems and problems of alcohol/drug abuse and dependence and their pre and post-natal antecedents.

The data which Seattle 500 collects is the basis of other research.

References

External links

Cohort studies
University of Washington projects